The Tennessee Titans are a National Football League (NFL) franchise that began play as the Houston Oilers in 1960, a charter member of the American Football League. The Oilers relocated to Nashville, Tennessee in 1997, playing as the Tennessee Oilers before changing their name to the Tennessee Titans in 1999. The Titans' first draft selection was as the Oilers  and they selected Billy Cannon, a halfback from Louisiana State University, in the 1960 AFL Draft. The team's first draft selection as the Titans was Jevon Kearse, a defensive end from the University of Florida, in the 1999 NFL Draft. The team's most recent first-round selection was Caleb Farley, a cornerback from Virginia Tech, in the 2021 NFL Draft. The Titans have selected the number one overall pick in the draft twice. They have also selected the second overall pick thrice and the third overall pick six times. The team's five selections from the University of Texas at Austin are the most chosen by the Titans from one university.

Every year during April, each NFL franchise seeks to add new players to its roster through a collegiate draft known as "the NFL Annual Player Selection Meeting", which is more commonly known as the NFL Draft. Teams are ranked in inverse order based on the previous season's record, with the worst record picking first, and the second worst picking second and so on. The two exceptions to this order are made for teams that appeared in the previous Super Bowl; the Super Bowl champion always picks 32nd, and the Super Bowl loser always picks 31st. Teams have the option of trading away their picks to other teams for different picks, players, cash, or a combination thereof. Thus, it is not uncommon for a team's actual draft pick to differ from their assigned draft pick, or for a team to have extra or no draft picks in any round due to these trades.

The Titans drafted four consecutive future Pro Football Hall of Fame inductees, Robert Brazile, Earl Campbell, Mike Munchak and Bruce Matthews in the first rounds of the 1975, 1978, 1982 and 1983 NFL Drafts respectively.

Key

Player selections

References
 
 

Tennessee Titans

first-round draft picks